Springfield is a ward in south east Birmingham, England, created in 2004 from much of the old Sparkhill ward. It is a part of the formal district of Hall Green.

Places of interest
The area is served by the Sparkhill Library that has, with its distinctive clock tower, developed into a local landmark. It was built in 1900 as the council house for the Yardley District Council. The building was converted into a library and opened on 19 January 1923. It is one of the earliest examples of double glazing windows in a public building.

St John's Church, Sparkhill is the Anglican Parish church for the northern part of Springfield Ward. It is also home of the charity, Narthex Sparkhill. Also in the area is St Christopher's Church, Springfield.

Politics
It is represented on Birmingham City Council by three Labour councillors.

Transport
Spring Road railway station is located within the ward's boundaries and is located on the Birmingham Snow Hill-Stratford-upon-Avon line.
National Express West Midlands operates the numbers 2, 3, 5, 6, and 31 bus routes, to and from Birmingham city centre.

References

External links
Birmingham City Council: Springfield Ward

Areas of Birmingham, West Midlands
Former wards of Birmingham, West Midlands